Stéphane Brosse  (20 October 197117 June 2012) was a French ski mountaineer.

Biography 
Brosse was born in Le Pont-de-Beauvoisin, Savoie. He started ski mountaineering in 1990 and competed the first time at the Miage Contamines Somfy race in 1995. In 1996 he became a member of the national team. Together with Pierre Gignoux he set the record and continued to hold it for the Mont Blanc course from 30 May  2003. The duo needed a total time of  5h 15' 47" for the total course, thereof about 4 hours and seven minutes for climbing up, and about one hour and seven minutes for the downhill race. Since 2003 he and Lionel Bonnel had also held the Chamonix-Zermatt Haute Route record with 21h 11'.

Stéphane Brosse died on 17 June 2012 while crossing the Aiguille d'Argentière in the Mont Blanc massif when a snow cornice collapsed under him, resulting in him falling between 600 and 700 metres. He was accompanied by Kílian Jornet Burgada, Sébastien Montaz-Rosset and Bastien Fleury. Brosse lived in Annecy. He was 40.

Selected results 
 1997:
 5th, French Championship
 5th, French Cup
 1998:
 3rd, French Cup
 4th, European Cup
 1999:
 1st, French Championship team (together with Patrice Bret)
 3rd, French national ranking
 6th, European Championship team race (together with Patrice Bret)
 2000:
 3rd, French national ranking
 2001:
 1st, European Championship team race (together with Pierre Gignoux)
 1st, Trophée des Gastlosen (European Cup, together with Pierre Gignoux)
 2nd, French national ranking
 2002:
 1st, World Championship single race
 1st, Tour du Rutor (together with Pierre Gignoux)
 2nd, World Championship combination ranking
 5th, World Championship team race together with Pierre Gignoux
 2003:
 1st, Dolomiti Cup team (together with Pierre Gignoux)
 2nd, European Championship single race
 2nd, European Championship combination ranking
 4th, European Championship team race together with Gignoux
 2004:
 1st, World Championship relay race together with Cédric Tomio, Florent Perrier and Patrick Blanc
 1st, Transcavallo race together with Gignoux
 2005:
 2nd, World Cup single race, Salt Lake City
 3rd, World Cup team race together with Patrick Blanc
 2006:
 1st, World Championship team race together with Patrick Blanc
 2nd, World Championship relay race together with Gachet, Florent Perrier and Patrick Blanc

Pierra Menta 

 1997: 10th, together with Patrice Bret
 1998: 7th, together with Patrice Bret
 1999: 3rd, together with Patrice Bret
 2000: 3rd, together with Patrice Bret
 2001: 1st, together with Pierre Gignoux
 2002: 2nd, together with Pierre Gignoux
 2003: 2nd, together with Pierre Gignoux
 2005: 1st, together with Patrick Blanc
 2006: 1st, together with Patrick Blanc

Trofeo Mezzalama 

 2001: 2nd, together with Jean Pellissier and Fabio Meraldi
 2003: 2nd, together with Jean Pellissier and Pierre Gignoux
 2005: 1st, together with Patrick Blanc and Guido Giacomelli

Patrouille des Glaciers 

 2000: 5th (and 3rd in "seniors I" class ranking), together with Francis Bibollet and Pierre Gignoux
 2004: 1st in record time, together with Jean Pellissier and Patrick Blanc
 2006: 1st in record time, together with Patrick Blanc and Guido Giacomelli

References 

French male ski mountaineers
World ski mountaineering champions
1971 births
2012 deaths
Sportspeople from Savoie
Sport deaths in France
Mountaineering deaths